The 2011 season is the 90th season of competitive football in Estonia.

National teams 

The home team or the team that is designated as the home team is listed in the left column; the away team is in the right column.

Senior

Friendly matches

UEFA Euro 2012 qualifying

Under-21

2013 UEFA European Under-21 Football Championship qualification

Under-19

2011 UEFA European Under-19 Football Championship elite qualification

League Tables

Meistriliiga

Esiliiga

II Liiga

East / North

West / South

Domestic cups

Estonian Cup

Home teams listed on top of bracket.  (AET): At Extra Time

Final

Estonian Supercup

Estonian clubs in international competitions

FC Flora Tallinn

JK Narva Trans

JK Nõmme Kalju

FC Levadia Tallinn

References

 Estonia tables at Soccerway
 Estonia national team at Soccerway

 
Seasons in Estonian football